Cave is a town located in the Timaru District, South Island, New Zealand. St. David's Memorial Church was commissioned by Thomas Burnett and designed by Herbert W. Hall. Built in 1930, it is registered as a category I heritage building with Heritage New Zealand.

Demographics
The settlement is part of the larger Levels Valley statistical area. 

Cave had a population of 78 at the 2018 New Zealand census, a decrease of 3 people (-3.7%) since the 2013 census, and unchanged since the 2006 census. There were 36 households. There were 42 males and 36 females, giving a sex ratio of 1.17 males per female. The median age was 54.6 years (compared with 37.4 years nationally), with 9 people (11.5%) aged under 15 years, 9 (11.5%) aged 15 to 29, 48 (61.5%) aged 30 to 64, and 12 (15.4%) aged 65 or older.

Ethnicities were 96.2% European/Pākehā, 3.8% Māori, and 3.8% Asian (totals add to more than 100% since people could identify with multiple ethnicities).

Although some people objected to giving their religion, 53.8% had no religion, 34.6% were Christian, and 3.8% were Buddhist.

Of those at least 15 years old, 6 (8.7%) people had a bachelor or higher degree, and 24 (34.8%) people had no formal qualifications. The median income was $26,500, compared with $31,800 nationally. The employment status of those at least 15 was that 33 (47.8%) people were employed full-time, and 12 (17.4%) were part-time.

References

Timaru District
Populated places in Canterbury, New Zealand